RWB Adria (full name: Red White and Blue Adria, Croatian: Crven, bijeli, plavi Jadran) is an American soccer club from Chicago, Illinois. The club currently competes in the Midwest Premier League as well as the National Soccer League of Chicago.

History
RWB Adria was founded in 1959 by Croatian immigrants in the city of Chicago. From its humble beginnings the club has gone on to become one of the most successful soccer clubs in Illinois, and is believed to have won the most trophies of any club in Illinois soccer. The most high-profile player to have played for RWB Adria is the legendary Portuguese player Eusébio who had a stint at the club in the late 1970s.

The club has been a regular participant in the Croatian North American Soccer Tournament since the competitions inception in 1964. RWB Adria has won the tournament on 12 occasions, second only to Toronto Croatia. RWB Adria has also participated in the U.S. Open Cup, the American equivalent of the FA Cup, five times: in 1991 (where the club was a semi-finalist), in 1996, in 2007, in 2008, and 2014. The club’s main rivals include fellow Croatian-American sides from Chicago, HNK Zrinski Chicago and HNNK Hrvat Chicago.

2015 saw RWB compete in the fledgling Great Lakes Premier League along with teams from Wisconsin and Michigan. RWB won the league with a 100% record in the five games played by the time the final decision went their way with Oakland United's 3-4 home defeat on July 12.

The team announced it would play in the Midwest Premier League in 2020, but the covid pandemic forced cancellation of that season and a delay until 2021

Honors
National Amateur Cup: 2011, 2013
Great Lakes Premier League: 2015
National Soccer League of Chicago champions (8): 2006, 2007, 2010, 2011, 2012, 2014, 2015, 2016 
Peel Cup (Illinois State Cup) champions (9): 1988, 1989, 1993, 1994, 2002, 2003, 2005, 2006, 2008
Croatian-North American Soccer Tournament champions (12): 1966, 1980, 1982, 1984, 1985, 1994, 1998, 2001, 2002, 2003, 2004, 2007
Hank Steinbrecher Cup (US Soccer Amateur Championship): 2014

U.S. Open Cup
1996
First Round: El Paso Patriots - RWB Adria 3-0
2008
First Round: Rochester Rhinos - RWB Adria 2-1
2013
First Round: Pittsburgh Riverhounds - RWB Adria 1-1 (5-3 p)
2014
First Round: Detroit City FC - RWB Adria 2-2 aet (1-3 p)
Second Round: Michigan Bucks - RWB Adria 0-1 aet 
Third round: Pittsburgh Riverhounds - RWB Adria 3-2 aet 
 2015
First Round: Lansing United - RWB Adria 0-0 (4-2 p)

References

Association football clubs established in 1959
Croatian-American culture in Illinois
Croatian-American history
Soccer clubs in Chicago
Soccer clubs in Illinois
United Premier Soccer League teams
National Soccer League (Chicago) teams
1959 establishments in Illinois
Great Lakes Premier League teams
Croatian sports clubs outside Croatia
Diaspora soccer clubs in the United States